Mölkky, also known as Finska, is a Finnish throwing game invented by Lahden Paikka company (formerly known as Tuoterengas) in 1996. It is reminiscent of kyykkä, a centuries-old throwing game with Karelian roots. However, Mölkky does not require as much physical strength as kyykkä, and is more suitable for everyone regardless of age and condition. Success in Mölkky is based on a combination of chance and skill. Lahden Paikka has sold nearly 200,000 sets in Finland.

2016 Lahden Paikka sold all rights of Mölkky, games production and the trademark to Finnish company Tactic Games Oy.  The name Mölkky is a protected trademark. All Mölkky games are manufactured in Pori, Finland.

Rules

The set consists of a throwing pin, and 12 shorter wooden pins (also called "skittles") numbered from 1 to 12. The pins are initially placed in a tight group in an upright position 3–4 meters away from the throwing line, with the pins organized as follows: 1st row, 1/2; 2nd row, 3/10/4; 3rd row, 5/11/12/6; 4th row, 7/9/8. The players take turns to toss the throwing pin to try and knock over the numbered pins.

Knocking over one pin scores the number of points marked on the pin. Knocking 2 or more pins scores the number of pins knocked over (e.g., knocking over 3 pins scores 3 points). A pin does not count if it is leaning on the throwing pin or one of the numbered pins (it must be parallel to the ground to count).

After each throw, the pins are stood up again in the exact location where they landed. The first player to reach exactly 50 points wins the game. Scoring more than 50 will be penalised by setting the player's score back to 25 points. A player will be eliminated from the game if they miss all of the numbered pins three times in a row.

Organizations and competitions

Mölkky players have started more than 250 Mölkky Associations. International Mölkky Organization is umbrella organization for Mölkky associations. 26 countries are currently official members.

The Finnish championships for mölkky have been organised in Lahti since 1997 by the union of youth clubs in Southern Tavastia. The technology students in Tampere organised world championships in academic Mölkky in 2001. The Finnish Mölkky Union has been formed to promote the game and its subculture. The first Australian Championships were held 2010 and then 2011.

The Mölkky World Championship in 2016 was the first Mölkky competition organised outside of Finland. The tournament was organized in Le Rheu, France. In 2017, it was organized in Prague in the Czech Republic, 2018 in Pori, Finland, 2019 in Samoëns, France and 2020 in Hyvinkää, Finland.

In the United States, US Mölkky Association is the governing body for events and tournaments and Mölkky USA coordinates social and marketing. They have sanctioned the U.S. Tour since 2015 and have declared American Tour Champions and United States 2v2 Champions each year since then. The Berzerkerz/Brozerkerz ( Clint Childers & Coleman Rydie) are the American Tour Champions in 2015, 2016, 2017, 2018, 2019, and 2020. The Mölkky Mashers (Dan Charron & Jim Childers) are the current American Tour Champions, taking the title in 2021. In September 2022, L.A. Mölkky (Scott Dyer & Boomer Reisinger) won the United States 2v2 Championship.

References

External links

Tactic Games Oy
www.molkky.com
International Mölkky Organization
Finnish International Mölkky Association web site (in Finnish; English version)
Tuoterengas (in Finnish)
HONG KONG MOLKKY 木棋 
Slovak Mölkky Association (in Slovak)
French Mölkky Association (in French)
Japan Mölkky Association 
Czech Mölkky Association
SMS Södertälje Mölkky Sällskap, Sweden Association
Canadian Mölkky Association
List of Mölkky tournaments by Mölkky World

Lawn games
Precision sports
Finnish games
Sports originating in Finland
Throwing games
Bowling